Coinduced may refer to:
 Coinduced topology
 Coinduced module